Seagate Software, Inc., was an international software company formed when Seagate Technology, merged its software assets with Arcada Software. Kevin Azzouz, Arcada CEO was elected by the Seagate board as president.

Seagate Software was sold to Veritas Software in 1999 in a deal worth $1.6 billion. On March 29, 2000, Seagate announced the sale of all its remaining Veritas Software shares to Veritas Software. The finalisation of the deal was announced on November 22, 2000.

See also
 NTBackup

References

Defunct software companies of the United States
Software companies based in California